Chhim Sithar is a Cambodian trade union leader, currently serving as head of the Labor Rights Supported Union (LSRU) of Khmer Employees of NagaWorld.

Biography 
Sithar was born in Prey Veng province, the second of six children. She earned a bachelor's degree in economic informatics. She began working at NagaWorld in 2007 before becoming active within the LSRU in 2009.

In September 2019, she was suspended by NagaWorld after questioning the company's decision to ban a t-shirt calling for higher wages for employees. In December 2019, the members of the LSRU voted to strike in response to the suspension. Despite a court ruling that the strike was illegal, the LSRU proceeded with it in early-January 2020. After two days of strike action, the company agreed to raise wages and re-institute Sithar.

In mid-2021, NagaWorld announced that it would be firing over 600 workers from the casino, including Sithar. Sithar subsequently alleged that the company had targeted union members with the firings, stating that the union was close to reaching its goal of 4000 members, or half of the casino's employees, at which point the union would be allowed to engage in collective bargaining under Cambodian law.

On 3 January 2022, she led the LSRU in a strike calling for the reinstatement of the fired employees. The next day, she was violently arrested by plainclothes policemen and was charged with "incitement to commit a felony." She was subsequently held in pretrial detention for 74 days, being released on bail in March.

In April 2022, she was re-elected as head of the LSRU. In June 2022, the Ministry of Labour and Vocational Training announced that it would not recognise the union's registration, claiming that Sithar was no longer an employee of NagaWorld and could therefore no longer hold an elected position in the union.

In late-November 2022, she attended the World Congress of the International Trade Union Confederation. Upon her return to Cambodia, she was arrested on charges of violating bail conditions. Amnesty International condemned the arrest, stating that neither she nor her lawyer were informed of the bail conditions and that she was "being detained solely for her work defending workers’ rights." The United States Department of State also called for her release. On 14 March 2023, a trial hearing was held by the Phnom Penh Municipal Court on her case, and Human Rights Watch released a statement calling the charges against her "baseless" and saying that "the Cambodian government has an obligation under international human rights law not only to respect the rights of workers but also to protect these rights from abuse by private actors." A spokesperson for the Ministry of Justice responded to Human Rights Watch by saying that "the accused have already crossed the line of existing labour dispute resolution mechanisms" and that "this case follows standard legal proceedings. Just as in any court case, solid evidence and strong testimony must be presented to discharge the accused."

Awards and recognition 
On 2 February 2023, Sithar was awarded the Global Human Rights Defender Award by the United States Department of State, the first person from Cambodia to receive the award.

References 

Cambodian activists
Cambodian trade unionists
People from Prey Veng province